Numa Coste (31 August 1843 – 10 June 1907) was a French painter and journalist.

Early life
Numa Coste was born on 31 August 1843 in Aix-en-Provence, in south-eastern France.

Career
Coste started his career as a notary's clerk. He later served as a sergeant in the civil service.

After he received his inheritance, he became a painter of still lifes. In 1880, he co-founded L'Art Libre, an artistic publication, with Émile Zola, Étienne Dujardin-Beaumetz, Paul Alexis et Marius Roux. He stopped painting in 1885, and became the editor of Le Sémaphore, the oldest newspaper in Marseille, under the pseudonym of Pierre Tournel. He also wrote articles for Le Mémorial d'Aix.

Death
He died on 10 June 1907 in Aix-en-Provence.

References

1843 births
1907 deaths
Artists from Aix-en-Provence
French journalists
19th-century French painters
French male painters
19th-century French male artists